The 1985 Molson Light Challenge, also known as the Toronto Indoor, was a men's tennis tournament played on indoor carpet courts at the Varsity Arena in Toronto, Ontario, Canada, that was part of the 1985 Nabisco Grand Prix. It was the inaugural edition of the tournament and was held from February 18 through February 24, 1985. Third-seeded Kevin Curren won the singles title and earned $25,000 first-prize money.

Finals

Singles

 Kevin Curren defeated  Anders Järryd, 7–6(8–6), 6–3
 It was Curren's only singles title of the year and the 3rd of his career.

Doubles

 Peter Fleming /  Anders Järryd defeated  Glenn Layendecker /  Glenn Michibata, 7–6(8–6), 6–2

Prize money

*per team

References

External links
 ITF tournament edition details

Toronto Indoor
Toronto Indoor